Thattumpurath Achuthan is a 2018 Indian Malayalam-language comedy film directed by Lal Jose and scripted by M. Sindhuraj. The film stars Kunchacko Boban  in the lead role. It also features debutante Sravana and Thejus Jyothi. Roby Raj was the cinematographer and editing was done by Ranjan Abraham.

Plot
Achuthan (Kunchacko Boban) lives in a village with his father Gangadharan (Nedumudi Venu). He is contented  with his life, friends and the simple village life. He works as a cashier at a store and  volunteers in the Chellaparambil temple in his spare time. He is persuaded to keep watch while one of his friends Madhu (R. Vishva) steals money from his own house to set up a business.  The robbery goes wrong as the people in the house wake up and his friend vanishes with the money while Achuthen is caught and charged for the robbery. He loses his job and the police keep picking him up for any crime in the village. Meanwhile, while clearing the donation box of the temple, he finds a letter addressed to the deity. The letter is an appeal for help to God from the mother of a girl who is being black mailed by her ex boyfriend. He makes his mission to solve the troubles of the girl who put the letter in the donation box. From there on his life starts to change.

Cast
 Kunchacko Boban as Achuthan aka Achu
 Sravana T N as Jayalakshmi aka Jaya
 Kalabhavan Shajohn as Sub Inspector Justin John
Master Adish Praveen as Kunjoottan
 Hareesh Kanaran as Shoukath 
 Biju Sopanam as Shekharan Namboothiri
 Kochu Preman as Kumaranashan
 Anil Murali as Simitheri Babu
 Santhosh Keezhattoor as Santhosh, Shekharan Namboothiri's Relative
 Irshad as  Pattaru Joseph
 Johny Antony  as Karatte Sukumaran
 Thara Kalyan as Nirmala
 Veena nair as Sunandha
 Vijayaraghavan as Rajan
 Seema G. Nair as Lathika, Rajan's Wife
 Nedumudi Venu as Gangadharan
 Bindu Panicker as Girija
 Thejus Jyothi as Binoy
 R. Vishva as Madhu
 Ann Saleem as Reshma
 Venkitesh VP as Singer in the song "Muthumani Radhe"
 Roshan Ullas as Vijay 
 Malavika Krishnadas as Bride
 Siddhi Vinayak as Binoy's Friend
 Meenakshi Raveendran as Wedding Guest
 Amina Nijam as Wedding guest
 Sethu Lekshmi as Ammini
 Subeesh Sudhi as Suniappan
 Sathi Premji as Kunjoottan's Grandmother
 Anjana Appukkuttan as Ambujam
 Shyni T Rajan as Kousalya
 Binu Adimali as Police Constable
 Dinesh Engoor as Auto driver

Production
The movie is bankrolled by Shebin Backer under the banner of shebin backer productions. Filming began in September 2018. The film was mostly set in Taliparamba, Kannur.

Release
The film was released on 22 December 2018.

Reception
The film received mixed reviews from critics. Sify rated the film 3/5 and stated that "The film is a light-hearted entertainer that has its fine moments". Filmibeat gave it a 3/5, stating "It is definitely a simple entertainer that qualifies for a decent watch". Manorama Online stating that "It is definitely a watchable affair with families as it genuinely attempts a neat entertainer".

Soundtrack
Lyrics by B. R. Prasad and Anil Panachooran.

 "Mangalakaaraka" -  Sudeep Kumar, Manjari, Aavani
 "Mazha Varanande" -  Anil Panachooran
 "Muth Muth Raadhe" -  Vijesh Gopal, Chorus
 "Nenjinullilaake" -  Vineeth Sreenivasan, Radhika Narayanan
 "Vidilla Poonda Kallaa" -  K. S. Chitra, Sujatha Mohan

References

External links
 
Thattumpurath Achuthan on Nowrunning.com

2018 films
2010s Malayalam-language films
Indian thriller drama films
Films shot in Kannur
2018 thriller drama films
Films directed by Lal Jose